Duan Yihong (born May 16, 1973) is a Chinese actor best known for his role as Yuan Lang in Soldiers Sortie (2006), Long Wenzhang in My Chief and My Regiment (2009), and Hei Wa in White Deer Plain (2011).

Biography 
Duan Yihong was born in Yili, Xinjiang province. In 1992 and 1993, he applied to the Central Academy of Drama, but he was not accepted. Third -degree candidates until 1994, that he was admitted. After graduating in 1998, he entered the National Theatre Company of China. After, Duan starred in many plays, he is the drama Rhinoceros in Love second-generation actor. During this period, he was renamed to Duan Yihong.

Personal life
Duan began dating Chinese-Japanese actress Wang Jin in 2002. He married Wang on 12 June 2011 in Beijing.

Filmography

Film

Television series

Accolades

References 

 http://www.china.org.cn/culture/2009-05/29/content_17852175.htm

External links 

Chinese male film actors
Chinese male television actors
Living people
1973 births
Central Academy of Drama alumni
Male actors from Xinjiang
People from Ili
21st-century Chinese male actors
20th-century Chinese male actors